From Time to Time may refer to:

From Time to Time (film), a 2009 British film directed by Julian Fellowes
The Timekeeper or From Time to Time (1992), a Circle-Vision 360° film shown at Disney theme parks
From Time to Time (novel), a 1995  novel by Jack Finney
From Time to Time – The Singles Collection (1991), an album by Paul Young
"From Time to Time", a song by Rascal Flatts from the  album Rascal Flatts (2000)
"From Time to Time", a song by Ride from the  album Carnival of Light (1994)